Thedicks Australian Roller Hockey National Championship is the biggest Roller Hockey Clubs Championship in Australia.

Participated Teams in the last Season
The teams that participated in the last Australian championship, in Sunshine, Melbourne, were:Cannons RHC, Taipans RHC, Kwinana RHC, Mordialloc RHC, Australia u20, Dandenong RHC, Lisport RHC and Northsports RHC

List of Winners

Number of Championships by team

Participating Teams in the 2006 Club Championship
 
 
 Venue - Stafford Skate Centre, Brisbane, Queensland.

Dandenong (Senior), Mackay Mustangs (Pee Wee, Juvenile, Intermediate, Women, Senior), Mordialloc (Senior), Northsports Inc. (Pee Wee, Juvenile, Women, Senior), Paco De Arcos (Senior), Scorpions (Juvenile, Intermediate, Women), Skateabout (Senior), Stafford (Pee Wee, Women, Senior), Stafford Kings (Senior), Papatoetoe NZ (Pee Wee, Juvenile, Intermediate, Senior), Wellington NZ (Intermediate)

List of Winners

Participating States in the 2004 National Championship
 Venue - Northskate, Glenn Innes, New South Wales.

List of Winners

Participating Teams in the 2004 Club Championship
 
 
 Venue - Northskate, Glenn Innes, New South Wales.

Campbellfield Cannons (Juvenile, Women, Senior), Dandenong (Youth, Senior), MRSA Mackay Mustangs (Juvenile, Youth, Senior), Mordialloc (Senior), Northsports Inc. (Juvenile x2, Women, Senior), Skateabout (Senior), Stafford (Youth, Women, Senior), Australian Junior Development Squad (Senior), Australian Youth Development Squad (Women), Papatoetoe NZ (Senior)

List of Winners

List of Winners - Seniors
This is not an official result as there were no finals series, so an accumulation of points from win(3), draw(2), loss(1) and forfeit(0) was used. The Australian Junior Development Squad games haven't been counted in. The Campbellfield Canons team played one extra game (they played all teams). Northsports played all teams except the Australian Junior Development Squad, so I have assumed the extra game was against Campbellfield Canons, so neither team is awarded points for the game, although Campbellfield Canons defeated Northsports, which I have used to break the points tie! All other teams played 6 games if the game against the Australian Junior Development Squad isn't counted in. This results in Campbellfield Canons earning 14 points instead of 16 points. Skateabout ended with 16 points and actually defeated Campbellfield Canons 9 goals to 8 goals during the competition so earn 1st place (if Campbellfield Canons are awarded 16 points, goal difference makes this awkward!). This definitely needs to be confirmed by the Officials so purely non-official results only.

Participating States in the 2003 National Championship
 Venue - Skateabout, Albury, New South Wales.

List of Winners

Participating Teams in the 2003 Club Championship
 Venue - Skateabout, Albury, New South Wales.

Albury (Senior), Beechworth (Youth), Campbellfield Canons (Juvenile, Youth, Women), Dandenong (Youth, Senior), Kwinana (Women, Senior, Masters), MRSA Mackay Mustangs (Juvenile, Youth, Senior), Mordialloc (Senior), Northsports (Youth, Women, Senior), Skateabout (Senior), Stafford (Women, Senior), Australian Junior Development Squad (Senior), New Zealand Combined (Youth)

List of Winners

Overall Club Champion
Campbellfield

Participating States in the 2000 National Championship
 Venue - Springers Leisure Centre, Keysborough, Victoria.

Date - 26/09/2000 to 29/09/2000.

List of Winners

Overall State Points

Participating Teams in the 2000 Club Championship
 Venue - Springers Leisure Centre, Keysborough, Victoria.

Date - 20/09/2000 to 25/09/2000.

Bunbury (Juvenile, Junior, Senior), Campbellfield (Pee Wee, Juvenile, Youth, Junior, Senior), Dandenong (Pee Wee, Juvenile, Youth, Women), Harvey (Youth), Kwinana (Juvenile, Youth, Junior, Women, Senior, Masters), Lisport (Senior), Mordialloc (Youth, Senior), Northsports Inc. (Juvenile, Junior, Women, Senior, Masters), Paco de Arcos (Junior, Senior), Skateabout (Senior, Masters), Stafford (Senior), Townsville (Junior, Women)

List of Winners

Overall Club Points

Participating States in the 1997 National Championship
 
 
 Venue - Homebush Hall B, Sydney, New South Wales.

List of Winners

Participating Teams in the 1997 Club Championship
 
 
 Venue - Campbellfield Roller Skating Rink, Melbourne, Victoria.

Albury (Youth, Junior), Campbellfield (Pee Wee, Juvenile, Youth), Dandenong (Juvenile, Youth), Lisport (Junior, Senior), Mordialloc (Pee Wee, Senior), Muswellbrook (Senior), Paco DeArcos (Juvenile, Junior), Stafford (Junior, Senior), Windser Skatel (Senior)

List of Winners

Number of Championships by Club

External links

Australian websites
Skate Australia-Roller Hockey
Skate Western Australia-Roller Hockey
Skate Queensland-Roller Hockey
Skate NSW-Roller Hockey
Skate South Australia

Australia Teams Websites

International
 Roller Hockey links worldwide
 Mundook-World Roller Hockey
Hardballhock-World Roller Hockey
Inforoller World Roller Hockey 
 World Roller Hockey Blog
rink-hockey-news - World Roller Hockey

References

Roller hockey competitions in Australia
Australia
National championships in Australia